Stroppa is an Italian surname. Notable people with the surname include:

Giovanni Stroppa (born 1968), Italian footballer and manager
John Stroppa (born 1926), Canadian football player
Marco Stroppa (born 1959), Italian composer

Italian-language surnames